Shannon River may refer to:
River Shannon, Ireland
Shannon River (Minnesota), located in Saint Louis County, Minnesota
Shannon River (Tasmania), a tributary of Ouse River (Tasmania)
Shannon River (Western Australia), a river in Western Australia.